Ziaur Rashid (born 19 March 1968) better known as Rupam who played for Biman Bangladesh Airlines
in first-class or List A matches during the 2000–01 season, the only one in which the team was functioning at the highest level of Bangladeshi cricket. He made his first class debut for Chittagong Division in the 2000/01 season.

See also
 List of Chittagong Division cricketers
 List of Biman Bangladesh Airlines cricketers

References

Bangladeshi cricketers
Chittagong Division cricketers
Biman Bangladesh Airlines cricketers
Living people
1968 births